Juan Carlos Muñoz may refer to:

Juan Carlos Muñoz (footballer, born 1919), Argentine football winger and manager
Juan Carlos Muñoz (footballer, born 1968), Chilean football winger
Juan Carlos Muñoz (footballer, born 1978), Chilean football defender
Juan Carlos Muñoz (politician) (born 1970), Chilean politician and engineer
Juan Carlos Muñoz Márquez (born 1950), Mexican politician

See also
Juan Muñoz (disambiguation)